The 2014–15 George Washington Colonials women's basketball team represented George Washington University during the 2014–15 college basketball season. Jonathan Tsipis resumed the responsibility as head coach for a third consecutive season. The Colonials were members of the Atlantic 10 Conference and played their home games at the Charles E. Smith Center. They finished the season 29–4, 15–1 in A-10 play to win the A-10 regular season title and also won the A-10 Tournament. They received an automatic bid to the NCAA women's tournament where they lost to Gonzaga in the first round.

2014–15 media

George Washington Colonials Sports Network
WRGW carried the Colonials games and broadcast them online at GWRadio.com. The A-10 Digital Network also carry all non-televised Colonials home games and most conference road games through RaiseHigh Live.

Roster

Schedule

|-
!colspan=9 style="background:#002654; color:#EBC772;"| Exhibition

|-
!colspan=9 style="background:#EBC772; color:#002654;"| Regular Season

|-
!colspan=9 style="background:#002654; color:#EBC772;"| Atlantic 10 Tournament

|-
!colspan=9 style="background:#002654; color:#EBC772;"| NCAA Women's Tournament

Rankings
2014–15 NCAA Division I women's basketball rankings

See also
 2014–15 George Washington Colonials men's basketball team
 George Washington Colonials women's basketball

References

George Washington Colonials women's basketball seasons
George Washington
George